Tacna is a city in southern Peru.  Tacna may also refer to:

 The Tacna Region, also in Peru
 Tacna Province, a province in the Tacna region in Peru
 Tacna District, a district in the Tacna province in Peru
 the former name of the Roman Catholic Diocese of Tacna y Moquegua
 Tacna, Arizona, a census-designated place in the United States